Gregory Donovan Ostertag (born March 6, 1973) is an American former professional basketball player. He spent most of his career with the Utah Jazz of the National Basketball Association (NBA). He played college basketball at the University of Kansas.

High school career
Ostertag starred at Duncanville High School in Duncanville, Texas, a suburb of Dallas.  He averaged 22.5 points and 13 rebounds per game during his senior season, and capped the year by leading the Panthers to the 1991 state championship, the first-ever for the school's boys basketball team.

College career 
After his successful high school career, Ostertag joined the basketball team at the University of Kansas.  Standing 7-foot-2 and weighing 280 pounds, Ostertag provided a strong presence in the paint, helping the Jayhawks reach the NCAA Final Four in 1993.  Statistically, his best season was his junior year (1993–94), when he averaged 10.3 points and 8.8 rebounds per game.  Most impressive, he set a school record by blocking 97 shots that year.  He graduated in 1995 with career totals of 968 points and 770 rebounds, along with 258 blocked shots – the highest total in the history of Kansas and the Big 8 Conference at that time (since surpassed by Jeff Withey).

Professional career

Utah Jazz (1995–2004) 
The Utah Jazz selected Ostertag with the 28th pick in the first round of the 1995 NBA draft. The Jazz hoped he could fill a void in the team's defense created by the retirement of Mark Eaton a few seasons earlier. Ostertag saw limited action in his rookie year, but emerged as Utah's starting center during his second season. The Jazz made back-to-back appearances in the NBA Finals in 1997 and 1998, with Ostertag providing strong defense in the playoffs against the likes of Hakeem Olajuwon, David Robinson, Tim Duncan, and Shaquille O'Neal.

Envisioning him as a potentially dominant defender in the future, the Jazz signed Ostertag to a long-term contract extension worth $39 million over six years. However, throughout the remainder of his career, Ostertag struggled with poor physical conditioning and inconsistent play, much to the chagrin of his coaches and teammates. Also, he constantly frustrated Jazz fans with his clumsiness and lack of skill on offense.  
Nevertheless, Ostertag made valuable contributions to the team on the defensive side of the floor, providing size and intimidation in the paint.  He never played full starter-level minutes, thus hindering his overall statistical totals, but he was one of the most efficient shot-blockers in the league during his career. He led the NBA in blocked shot percentage twice (in 2000 and 2002) and was particularly good at gaining possession of the ball after blocking a shot.

Sacramento Kings (2004–2005) 
Ostertag's contract expired in 2004, making him a free agent in the league.  After nine seasons in Utah, he joined the Sacramento Kings.

Return to Utah (2005–2006) 
Ostertag played one year in Sacramento, before the Kings sent him back to Utah in a "mega-trade" that involved five teams and 13 players—the largest trade in NBA history.  Ostertag played one final season (2005-06) with the Jazz, seeing limited action. He played his final game on April 19, 2006, a home contest against the Golden State Warriors. Having previously announced his retirement, and that game being the last of the season, Ostertag received a standing ovation from Jazz fans.  He played 3:36 in the game, all in the first quarter. Fittingly, he blocked a shot and grabbed a rebound—and missed two free throws. The Jazz won the game, giving the team a final record of 41-41 for the year, ensuring that Ostertag retired having never played for a losing team for his entire NBA career.

Texas Legends (2011–2012) 
In December 2011, Ostertag returned to professional basketball. He signed with the Texas Legends of the NBA Development League. However, after playing 10 games with the Legends, he ended his comeback due to knee injury.

Off the court
In 2002, Ostertag donated a kidney to save the life of his sister Amy (Hall) Ostertag, who was dying of complications from type 1 diabetes; upon his return he became the first player in NBA history to play after donating an organ. He has since been an advocate of organ donation.

Ostertag lives on a small cattle farm in Mount Vernon, Texas with his wife Shannon. They have one child, daughter Charlestynn (born in 2013). Ostertag also has three children from a previous marriage, son Cody (born in 1993), daughter Bailey (born in 1997), and daughter Shelby (born in 1999).

Ostertag is the co-founder of The Ostertag Group, an umbrella company that owns and operates ML Edwards & Co, Watermelon Mills Coffeehouse, and Ostertag Construction. Ostertag is also a licensed Realtor® with Century 21 Harvey Properties.

Career stats

NBA
Source

Regular season

|-
| style="text-align:left;"| 
| style="text-align:left;"| Utah
| 57||10||11.6||.473||–||.667||3.1||.1||.1||1.1||3.6
|-
| style="text-align:left;"| 
| style="text-align:left;"| Utah
| 77||70||23.6||.515||.000||.678||7.3||.4||.3||2.0||7.3
|-
| style="text-align:left;"| 
| style="text-align:left;"| Utah
| 63||23||20.4||.481||–||.479||5.9||.4||.4||2.1||4.7
|-
| style="text-align:left;"| 
| style="text-align:left;"| Utah
| 48||48||27.9||.476||–||.620||7.3||.5||.2||2.7||5.7
|-
| style="text-align:left;"| 
| style="text-align:left;"| Utah
| 81||3||19.8||.464||.000||.636||6.0||.2||.2||2.1||4.5
|-
| style="text-align:left;"| 
| style="text-align:left;"| Utah
| 81||3||18.4||.495||.500||.556||5.1||.3||.3||1.8||4.5
|-
| style="text-align:left;"| 
| style="text-align:left;"| Utah
| 74||14||15.0||.453||–||.485||4.2||.7||.2||1.5||3.3
|-
| style="text-align:left;"| 
| style="text-align:left;"| Utah
| 81||74||23.8||.518||–||.510||6.2||.7||.2||1.8||5.4
|-
| style="text-align:left;"| 
| style="text-align:left;"| Utah
| 78||51||27.6||.476||.000||.579||7.4||1.6||.4||1.8||6.8
|-
| style="text-align:left;"| 
| style="text-align:left;"| Sacramento
| 56||3||9.9||.440||.000||.342||3.0||.7||.1||.7||1.6
|-
| style="text-align:left;"| 
| style="text-align:left;"| Utah
| 60||22||13.5||.492||–||.500||3.8||1.0||.1||1.1||2.4
|- class="sortbottom"
| style="text-align:center;" colspan="2"| Career
| 756 || 321 || 19.5 || .486 || .100 || .569 || 5.5 || .6 || .3 || 1.7 || 4.6

Playoffs

|-
| style="text-align:left;"| 1996
| style="text-align:left;"| Utah
| 15 || 0 || 14.1 || .444 || – || .619 || 3.3 || .1 || .1 || 1.4 || 3.5
|-
| style="text-align:left;"| 1997
| style="text-align:left;"| Utah
| style="background:#cfecec;"|20* || 20 || 20.3 || .410 || – || .743 || 6.9 || .3 || .5 || 2.4 || 4.7
|-
| style="text-align:left;"| 1998
| style="text-align:left;"| Utah
| 19 || 1 || 17.7 || .565 || – || .480 || 4.3 || .3 || .4 || 1.9 || 3.4
|-
| style="text-align:left;"| 1999
| style="text-align:left;"| Utah
| 11 || 11 || 23.7 || .371 || – || .643 || 5.9 || .5 || .2 || 2.2 || 4.0
|-
| style="text-align:left;"| 2000
| style="text-align:left;"| Utah
| 8 || 0 || 21.5 || .526 || – || .455 || 5.6 || .3 || .3 || 2.1 || 3.8
|-
| style="text-align:left;"| 2001
| style="text-align:left;"| Utah
| 5 || 0 || 12.8 || .364 || – || .000 || 3.6 || .2 || .0 || .4 || 1.6
|-
| style="text-align:left;"| 2002
| style="text-align:left;"| Utah
| 4 || 0 || 21.8 || .619 || – || .100 || 8.5 || .5 || .5 || 1.8 || 6.8
|-
| style="text-align:left;"| 2003
| style="text-align:left;"| Utah
| 5 || 5 || 30.2 || .444 || – || .737 || 8.6 || 1.6 || .6 || 1.8 || 9.2
|-
| style="text-align:left;"| 2004
| style="text-align:left;"| Sacramento
| 2 || 0 || 13.0 || 1.000 || – || – || 4.5 || .0 || .5 || 1.0 || 3.0
|- class="sortbottom"
| style="text-align:center;" colspan="2"| Career
| 89 || 37 || 19.9 || .465 || – || .573 || 5.4 || .3 || .3 || 1.9 || 4.2

See also
 List of National Basketball Association career playoff blocks leaders
 List of National Basketball Association players with 10 or more blocks in a game

References

External links

Ostertag's NBA Draft History Page

1973 births
Living people
American men's basketball players
Basketball players from Dallas
Centers (basketball)
Duncanville High School alumni
Kansas Jayhawks men's basketball players
Organ transplant donors
People from Duncanville, Texas
People from Mount Vernon, Texas
Sacramento Kings players
Texas Legends players
Utah Jazz draft picks
Utah Jazz players